Wrecking Ball is the eighteenth studio album by American country artist Emmylou Harris, released on September 26, 1995 through Elektra Records. Moving away from her traditional acoustic sound, Harris collaborated with producer Daniel Lanois and engineer Mark Howard. The album has been noted for atmospheric feel, and featured guest performances by Steve Earle, Larry Mullen Jr., Kate & Anna McGarrigle, Lucinda Williams and Neil Young, who wrote the title song.

Background
Though her choice of songs had always been eclectic, the album was regarded as a departure. Harris, at the age of 48, had become something of an elder stateswoman in country music. The album received nearly universal acclaim, making many critics' year-end "best of" lists, and pointed Harris' career in a somewhat different direction where she would incorporate a harder edge. As a career-redefining album, Wrecking Ball was compared to Marianne Faithfull's 1979 Broken English album and Johnny Cash's American Recordings.  Wrecking Ball won the 1996 Grammy Award for Best Contemporary Folk Recording.

Content
Harris covered Neil Young's song "Wrecking Ball", and the track includes harmonies by Young. Although the song was released by Harris as a 2-track CD single with Lucinda Williams' "Sweet Old World", one reviewer did not consider the title track the high point on the album.

Track listing

Personnel
Emmylou Harris – vocals, acoustic guitar on 3 5 7 10 11 12, harmony vocals on 10
Daniel Lanois – mandolin on 1 2 3 5 8 10 11 12, electric guitar on 1 2 3 4 6 8 9 11 12, acoustic guitar on 2 7 11, bass on 1 3, dulcimer on 10, duet vocals on 1 9, chant vocals on 3, percussion on 4, bass pedals on 8
Malcolm Burn – piano on 2 4 8 11 12, tambourine on 4 10 11, vibes on 4, organ on 5 7, synthesizer on 5, keyboards on 6, slide guitar on 8 12, bass on 11, drums on 11, harmony vocals on 11
Larry Mullen Jr. – drums on 2 3 4 6 7 8 9 12, cymbal on 4, hand drum on 10
Tony Hall – percussion, bass on 2 4 6 7 12, stick drum on 10
Daryl Johnson – high harmony vocals on 1, tom tom on 1, drum kit bass pedals on 5, backing vocals on 5, harmonic bass on 6, harmony vocals on 10

Additional personnel
Brian Blade – drums on 1, Indian hand drum on 5
Steve Earle – acoustic guitar on 2 7 8
Sam O'Sullivan – roto wheel on 4
Neil Young – harmony vocals on 4 8, harmonica on 8
Kufaru Mouton – extra percussion on 5
Lucinda Williams – acoustic guitar on 8
Richard Bennett – tremolo guitar on 8
Anna McGarrigle – harmony vocals on 12
Kate McGarrigle – harmony vocals on 12

Charts

References

Emmylou Harris albums
1995 albums
Grammy Award for Best Contemporary Folk Album
Albums produced by Daniel Lanois
Elektra Records albums
Covers albums
Country folk albums